Boris Tsybin (14 June 1928 – 7 August 2011) was a Soviet speed skater. He competed in the men's 10,000 metres event at the 1956 Winter Olympics.

References

1928 births
2011 deaths
Soviet male speed skaters
Olympic speed skaters of the Soviet Union
Speed skaters at the 1956 Winter Olympics
People from Rzhev